Mateusz Mak (born 14 November 1991) is a Polish professional footballer who plays as a midfielder for Stal Mielec.

Career statistics

Club

Honours

Club
Piast Gliwice
Ekstraklasa: 2018–19

References

External links
 
 

Living people
1991 births
People from Sucha Beskidzka
Sportspeople from Lesser Poland Voivodeship
Association football midfielders
Polish footballers
Ruch Radzionków players
GKS Bełchatów players
Piast Gliwice players
Stal Mielec players
Ekstraklasa players
I liga players
II liga players
Poland under-21 international footballers